Lefteris Lyratzis (born 22 February 2000) is a Greek professional footballer who plays as a right-back for Super League club PAOK.

Career

Early career
He is a son of Kavala footballer Nikolaos Lyratzis. 
He was six years old when he first started training at Keravnos Krinidon. His family moved from Kavala to Thessaloniki in 2012 just for PAOK. It was here that Lefteris became a man, and here, where his two younger brothers also played football.
Lyratzis can play both as right and left interior midfielder, can use both feet comfortably and score, has a great character and is a brilliant student. One of the U14s’ skippers last season, he distinguished himself in all tournaments that he participated with PAOK.
He has always been a ‘leader’ at PAOK. He won the championship with the Under-14s and Under-15s during the 2014–15 season, and also when playing for the Under-17s, with which he also won a league title. Then again with the Under-19s he was also a title winner in the 2017–18 and 2018–19 seasons. Lyratzis has also represented Greece at every youth level, but his best career memory to date is the goal he scored for PAOK against Paris Saint-Germain at the Lennart Johansson tournament at the age of 13.

PAOK
A combination of hard work, maturity and continuous improvement saw him join the first team for pre-season training in the summer of 2018. In the 2018–19 season he played four times for the full senior side, and the next season he went out on loan to Volos.
On 28 June 2019, Lyratzis signed a long season contract with Super League club Volos on loan from PAOK. On 4 January 2020, Lyratzis opened the scoring for Juan Ferrando’s visitors after 35 minutes, helping his club to acquire a vital 2–1 away win against OFI. It was his first goal in the Super League. On 12 December 2021, he opened the score in a 2–1 home win game against Lamia. It was his first goal with PAOK in all competitions with the club. The 2021-22 season will be unforgettable for Lefteris Lyratzis. The young extreme defender of PAOK waited until December to play as a key player and from the moment he received the baptism of fire he became important for Răzvan Lucescu. To the point that even his teammates in the internal voting that took place in the locker rooms of Dikefalos to promote him as the best young football player of the team.

Career statistics

Club

Honours
PAOK
Super League Greece: 2018–19
Greek Cup: 2017–18, 2018–19, 2020–21 ;Runner-Up :2021–22

Individual
PAOK MVP of the Season: 2021–22

References

External links

Living people
2000 births
Association football defenders
Greek footballers
Greece under-21 international footballers
Greece youth international footballers
Super League Greece players
PAOK FC players
Volos N.F.C. players
Footballers from Kavala